Julio Moreschi (born 22 September 1963) is an Argentine cross-country skier. He competed at the 1984 Winter Olympics and the 1988 Winter Olympics.

References

1963 births
Living people
Argentine male cross-country skiers
Olympic cross-country skiers of Argentina
Cross-country skiers at the 1984 Winter Olympics
Cross-country skiers at the 1988 Winter Olympics
Sportspeople from Bariloche